Zhan Shichai (between 1841-1847 – 5 November 1893) was a Chinese giant who toured the world as "Chang the Chinese Giant" in the 19th century; his stage name is "Chang Woo Gow".

Zhan was born in Fuzhou, Fujian Province, in the 1840s, though reports of the year vary from 1841 to 1847. He left China in 1865 to travel to London where he appeared on stage, later travelling around Europe, and to the U.S. and Australia as "Chang the Chinese Giant". Zhan received a good education in various countries, and developed a good understanding of ten languages. In America, he earned a salary of $500 a month.

Kin Foo, the Chinese wife who accompanied Zhan from China, died in 1871, and Zhan later married Catherine Santley, a Liverpudlian whom he met in Sydney, Australia. They had two children: Edwin, born in 1877 in Shanghai, and Ernest, born in 1879 in Paris.

In 1878, Zhan retired from the stage and settled in Bournemouth, where he opened a Chinese teahouse and a store selling Chinese imports.

Zhan died in Bournemouth in 1893, four months after his wife, aged around 50.

See also 
Gigantism
List of tallest people
List of humans with gigantism

References 

1840s births
1893 deaths
People from Fuzhou
People with gigantism
Qing dynasty people